Panichatra is an elite residential area of Madaripur town in central Bangladesh.

Geographical location 
Panichatra is located under Madaripur Sadar upazila. Its total area is 16.61 acres (.0746514 sq km). It is bounded on the south by Saidarbali, Mubarakdi and Kulpaddi, on the south-east by Kulpaddi, on the east by Mahisherchar, on the north by Char Madanrai and on the west by Police Lines and Shakuni.

Panichatra can be divided into North and South Panichatra through wards 4 and 5.

Administrative structure 
Administrative activities of Panichatra area are under Madaripur Municipality. It is part of Madaripur-2 constituency No. 219 of the Jatiya Sangsad. Panichatra area is located in wards 4 and 5 under 703 mouza of Madaripur municipality.

The area is divided into several mahalla -

 Sang Panichatra,
 Panichatra Dighi,
 Bankers Colony.

Population 
The total population of Panichatra area is 3413 (441 + 2972) in 795 (109 + 686) families. Males constitute 49.22% of the population and females 50.78%. The highest number of ethnic groups is 93.38% Islam, Hindu 7.59%, Christian 0% and Buddhist 0.03%.

Education 
Panichatra has an average literacy rate of 86.85%, higher than the national average of 68.8%: male literacy is 88.8%, and female literacy is 84.9%. There is 1 Ebtedayi Madrasa, 1 Secondary School (including Primary, Boys and Girls), 1 Primary School and 1 Kindergarten in this area.

Notable educational institutions are:

 Al-Jabir High School (1981);
 Dargakhola Government Primary School (1926);
 Children's Grace (Kindergarten) School.

Numerical statistics

Religious places of worship 
There are six mosques and two temples in Panichatra area.

Health 
There are two private hospitals and one health and family planning center, one eye hospital  and one kidney hospital in Panichatra area.

 Islami Bank A. R. Hawladar Community Hospital Madaripur Limited;
 Campus Kidney and Dialysis Center;
 K. I. Digital Hospital and Diagnostic Center;
 Marie Stopes Clinic.

Government and non-government organizations 
There are three government offices, three clubs, two cooperative societies and six NGOs and charities in Panichatra area.

Places of interest 

 Narayan Temple;
 Panichatra Dighi;
 Madaripur Legal Aid Association Training and Resource Center;
 Social Forestry Nursery and Training Center.

Notable residents 

 ATM Kamaluzzaman – cultural organizer;
 Basher Mahmud – poet, writer, playwright, journalist, researcher;
 Shahjahan Khan – journalist;
 Shahana Shoilly – poet, writer, advocate, human rights activist;
 Saleha Begum – physician;
 Fazlul Haque – human rights activist, advocate;
 Mohammad Nizamuddin Ahmed – admiral, Chief of the Bangladesh Navy (2015–2019);
 Ishrat Jahan – physician;
 Samsul Alam Nannu – politician, social worker;
 Jahandar Ali Jahan – politician;
 Khoka Fakir – politician, social worker;
 Lekhan Mahmud – volunteer organizer, researcher;
 Ruhul Amin – UNO; received Public Administration Medal (2019);
 Manjurul Haque – poet, literary;
 M. Abdul Quader – literary, advocate.

References

See also 

 Madaripur Sadar
 Madaripur District

External links 

 
 Wikimapia – The location of Panichatra

Madaripur District
Cities in Bangladesh